Air Vice-Marshal Maurice Barker was India's first Anglo-Indian Air Marshal.

External links
 Reference in Indian Air Force PVSM List for the year 1972

Indian Air Force officers
Anglo-Indian people